Trenque Lauquen is a subdivision (partido) of the Buenos Aires Province, Argentina,  to the west of the city of Buenos Aires. The main town is Trenque Lauquen.

Settlements
Trenque Lauquen
Treinta de Agosto

Girodias
La Carreta

External links

 
 Trenque Lauquen.com.ar
 Flof.com.ar Aerial photograph of the City

1876 establishments in Argentina
Partidos of Buenos Aires Province